Melicertus is a genus of "king" prawns, comprising eight species which were previously classified as members of the genus Penaeus:
 
Melicertus canaliculatus (Olivier, 1811) - witch prawn
Melicertus hathor (Burkenroad, 1959)
Melicertus kerathurus (Forskål, 1775) - caramote prawn, striped prawn
Melicertus latisulcatus (Kishinouye, 1896) - western king prawn (Australia)
Melicertus longistylus (Kubo, 1943) - redspot king prawn 
Melicertus marginatus (Randall, 1840) - aloha prawn 
Melicertus plebejus (Hess, 1865) - eastern king prawn 
Melicertus similis Chanda & Bhattacharya, 2002

References

Penaeidae
Crustaceans of Australia
Crustacean genera
Taxa named by Constantine Samuel Rafinesque